South Bass Island is a small island in western Lake Erie, and a part of Ottawa County, Ohio, United States. It is the southernmost of the three Bass Islands and located 3 miles (4.6 km) from the south shore of Lake Erie. It is the third largest island in the Lake Erie Islands, and is part of Put-in-Bay Township. In the bay of South Bass is Gibraltar Island, home to the Ohio State University's Stone Laboratory.

The island is a popular recreation spot and is often referred to as the "Key West of Lake Erie." The village of Put-in-Bay is a popular tourist destination during the summer. It is served by ferry from nearby Port Clinton and Sandusky, both on the mainland. The island is the annual host of the Inter-Lake Yachting Association regatta, known as Bay Week.

Perry's Victory and International Peace Memorial, including Perry's Monument, commemorates the Battle of Lake Erie, which the United States won during the War of 1812. It is located on South Bass Island, near Put-In-Bay.

Geography
As of the 2000 census there were 631 residents on the island.

Access
Transportation to the island via car, bike, or walk-ons is provided by ferries from the Miller Boat Line (departing from the northern point of Catawba Island), and Jet Express (departing from Port Clinton, Sandusky,  and Lorain, Ohio). Other boat access is provided by various charter boat companies in the area. The island also has a small airport.  Golf carts are a popular method of transportation on the island.

Notable residents
John Brown Jr.

See also
Green Island (Ohio)
South Bass Island Light, a lighthouse
Populated islands of the Great Lakes

Representation in other media 
Pamela F. Service's 'tween' novel Phantom Victory (1994), features a main character, Terri, who lives on South Bass Island and works at the excavation of the historic Victory hotel, which burned down in 1919.

References
South Bass Island: Blocks 1024 thru 1067 and Block 1069, Census Tract 501, Ottawa County, Ohio United States Census Bureau

Gallery

References

External links

 Lake Erie Islands Historical Society

Islands of Ottawa County, Ohio
Islands of Lake Erie in Ohio